Maria Yvonne Gonzalez Rogers (born February 1, 1965) is an American lawyer and jurist serving as a U.S. district judge of the District Court for the Northern District of California. She was previously a California state court judge on the Alameda County Superior Court from 2008 to 2011.

Early life and education 

Rogers was born Maria Yvonne Gonzalez in 1965 in Houston, Texas. She graduated from Princeton University in 1987 with a Bachelor of Arts, cum laude. From 1987 to 1988, she worked as a legal researcher at a law firm in New Haven, Connecticut. She then attended the University of Texas School of Law, graduating in 1991 with a Juris Doctor.

Professional career 

From 1991 until 2003, Rogers worked as a litigator in private practice in San Francisco at the law firm of Cooley Godward LLP (now Cooley LLP). She was an equity partner at the firm from 1999 until 2001. Rogers was a member of the civil grand jury in Alameda County, California from 2005 until 2007, and served as foreperson from 2006 until 2007.

State court judicial service 

Rogers served as a pro tem judge in Alameda County, California from 2007 until 2008. In 2008, Republican Governor Arnold Schwarzenegger appointed Rogers, a Democrat, to the Alameda County Superior Court. She replaced Judge Carlos G. Ynostroza on the bench.

Federal judicial service 

On May 4, 2011, President Obama nominated Rogers to a seat on the United States District Court for the Northern District of California that had been vacated by Judge Vaughn Walker, who had retired at the end of 2010. The Senate confirmed her by an 89–6 vote on November 15, 2011. She received her commission on November 21, 2011. She is the first Latina to serve as a federal judge in the Northern District of California.

Rogers has adjudicated various cases against Apple. In 2012, Rogers dismissed a class action lawsuit with prejudice, upholding Apple's defense that the "Illinois Brick doctrine" from the Supreme Court case  applied, as only the developers of apps could be damaged by Apple's policies, and consumers did not have statutory standing to bring suit on the developers' behalf. The Court specifically noted that the 30% fee Apple collects is "a cost passed-on to consumers by independent software developers". The United States Court of Appeals for the Ninth Circuit reversed her decision, and the Court of Appeals was upheld by the Supreme Court in Apple Inc. v. Pepper.

In December 2014, Rogers presided over a jury trial against Apple, in which plaintiffs claimed DRM on Apple iTunes violated antitrust laws.  On December 16, 2014, the jury reached a verdict in favor of Apple.

Rogers presided over the Epic Games v. Apple case. On August 24, 2020, Rogers issued an order granting a temporary restraining order for Epic's Unreal Engine, finding that the termination of Epic's developer account could result in the inability to "save all the projects by third-party developers relying on the engine that were shelved while support was unavailable." However, Rogers refused to grant a temporary restraining order with respect to Epic's apps, including Fortnite, citing that Epic's current predicament "appears of its own making."

Notable activities 

Rogers was elected to the American Law Institute in 1990 and was elected to the ALI Council in 2009. She currently chairs the ALI's Membership Committee and serves as an Adviser on ALI's Principles of Election Law: Resolution of Election Disputes project.

Personal life 

Rogers' husband, Matthew C. Rogers, has served in various positions in the Obama administration. The couple live in Piedmont, California.

See also 
 List of first women lawyers and judges in California
 List of Hispanic/Latino American jurists

References

External links 

1965 births
Living people
21st-century American judges
California state court judges
Hispanic and Latino American judges
Judges of the United States District Court for the Northern District of California
Princeton University alumni
United States district court judges appointed by Barack Obama
University of Texas School of Law alumni
21st-century American women judges